Yordan Ivanov (born 16 August 1966) is a Bulgarian bobsledder. He competed in the four man event at the 1992 Winter Olympics.

References

1966 births
Living people
Bulgarian male bobsledders
Olympic bobsledders of Bulgaria
Bobsledders at the 1992 Winter Olympics
Place of birth missing (living people)